The Keighley by-election was a Parliamentary by-election held on 11 November 1913. The constituency returned one Member of Parliament (MP) to the House of Commons of the United Kingdom, elected by the first past the post voting system.

Vacancy

The incumbent, Sir Stanley Buckmaster, had been elected for the constituency in the 1911 Keighley by-election. He was required to fight another by-election on his appointment as Solicitor General for England and Wales.

Previous result

Candidates
Stanley Buckmaster

Henry Lascelles, Viscount Lascelles - 30-year old heir to the Earl of Harewood, whose peerage he succeeded to in 1929, and future husband of Mary, Princess Royal.

William Bland - local trade unionist member of local Independent Labour Party who was endorsed by the national Labour Party.

Result

Aftermath
A General Election was due to take place by the end of 1915. By the summer of 1914, the following candidates had been adopted to contest that election. Due to the outbreak of war, the election never took place.

The Yorkshire branch of the Independent Labour Party were keen to run a candidate.

Another by-election occurred in Keighley in 1915 when Buckmaster accepted a seat in the House of Lords.

References

 Craig, F. W. S. (1974). British parliamentary election results 1885-1918 (1 ed.). London: Macmillan.
 Wikipedia: en.wikipedia.org
 Who's Who: www.ukwhoswho.com
 Debrett's House of Commons 1916

1913 in England
1913 elections in the United Kingdom
Keighley
By-elections to the Parliament of the United Kingdom in Bradford constituencies
1910s in Yorkshire